Megachile ulrica is a species of bee in the family Megachilidae. It was described by Nurse in 1901.

References

Ulrica
Insects described in 1901